The air-sol moyenne portée (ASMP; medium-range air to surface missile) is a French nuclear air-launched cruise missile manufactured by MBDA France. In French nuclear doctrine it is called a "pre-strategic" weapon, the last-resort "warning shot" prior to a full-scale employment of strategic nuclear weapons. The missile's construction was contracted to Aérospatiale's Tactical Missile Division, now part of MBDA. The cost of the missile development in 1988 was $600 million or $1.37 billion in FY 2021.

ASMP entered service in May 1986.  An improved version, the ASMP-A, was developed between 1997 and 2009.

Development

ASMP
ASMP entered service in May 1986, replacing the earlier free-fall AN-22 bomb on France's Dassault Mirage IV aircraft and the AN-52 bomb on Dassault Super Étendard. About 84 weapons are stockpiled. Carrier aircraft are the Dassault Mirage 2000N, Rafale and Super Étendard. The Mirage IVP carried the ASMP until retired in 1996.

It is a supersonic standoff missile powered by a liquid fuel ramjet.

In 1991, 90 missiles and 80 warheads were reported to have been produced. By 2001, 60 were operational.

ASMP-A 
It entered service in October 2009 with the Mirage 2000NK3 of squadron EC 3/4 at Istres and in July 2010 with the Rafales of squadron EC 1/91 at Saint Dizier.
54 ASMP-A have been delivered to French air force.

ASMPA-R 
The ASMPA-R (renovated) project, launched in 2016, will see the missile's range extended and a new 300kt thermonuclear warhead added.

Successor 
The studies for the successor to the ASMP, dubbed ASN4G (Air-Sol Nucléaire de 4ème Génération), a scramjet-powered hypersonic cruise missile have already begun. The aim is to design a missile capable of either high supersonic (Mach 4–5) or hypersonic flight (Mach 7–8).
ASN4G is being developed and will be manufactured by ArianeGroup.

Operators

French Air Force
French Navy

References

External links

ASMP on FAS.org
L’ASMP-A, nouvelle arme de la dissuasion, Ministère de la Defense

Cruise missiles
Cold War air-to-surface missiles of France
Air-to-surface missiles of France
Cruise missiles of France
Nuclear cruise missiles
Nuclear air-to-surface missiles
Nuclear missiles of France
Military equipment introduced in the 1980s